Filippo Visconti may refer to:

 Filippo Maria Visconti (1392–1447), Duke of Milan
 Filippo Visconti (bishop) (1596–1664), Roman Catholic Bishop of Catanzaro
 Filippo Maria Visconti (bishop) (1721–1801), Archbishop of Milan